Samantha Jane Lane (born 5 June 1979) is an Australian AFL and sports writer for The Age newspaper, television and radio personality and daughter of veteran journalist and commentator Tim Lane. She was a panellist on Before The Game on Network Ten for over a decade.

Lane was a footy fanatic even during secondary education at St Michael's Grammar School where she had a keen interest in sport as well as aerobics and drama and began writing about Australian Rules Football while completing a Bachelor of Arts and language degree in French at Melbourne University. She now has experience across all major media—print, online, television and radio—as well as public speaking engagements.

Journalism

Lane started out writing for the Carlton Football Club monthly magazine and writing reports for the AFL website.

Lane is a sports writer with The Age newspaper in Melbourne. She joined The Sunday Age sports team in 2005 before crossing to the weekday Age in 2007. Although well known as a football journalist, she also covers other major sporting events for the paper, including the Australian Open tennis, Commonwealth Games and Olympic Games.
In 2018 she released a book called roar.

Television
Lane was a panellist on Network Ten's Before the Game AFL panel show from 2003 until leaving at the end of the 2012 football season. She also made regular contributions on Melbourne community radio station Triple R.

In 2013, Lane joined the Seven Network for its Saturday night AFL coverage.

Lane is also a cast member of the ABC Television documentary series Agony Aunts and The Agony of Life.
2017–present. She has been one of the hosts for Channel 7's AFL women’s coverage.

Radio
Since 2008, she has been a part of the ABC's Radio AFL coverage, joining Stan Alves and Gerard Whatley in the pre-match discussion on Sunday afternoons.

Community work
Lane sits on the advisory committee of the Melbourne Vixens’ board, has been an ambassador for the Basil Sellers Art Prize and Run Melbourne and has an ongoing ambassadorial role for Breast Cancer Network Australia. She has also been a player in the Community Cup charity.

Awards
 2007: AFL Players' Association. Football Writer of the Year
 2009: Melbourne Press Club Quill Awards. Best Sports Story in any Medium
 2011: AFL Coaches Association. Media Award in recognition of journalistic excellence
 2011: vicsport. Media Award
 2012: Australian Sports Commission awards. Highly Commended for best coverage of sport by an individual (print)

References

External links

Lane's profile on her management company's website

1979 births
Living people
Australian sportswriters
21st-century Australian journalists
Australian women radio presenters
Australian television presenters
People educated at St Michael's Grammar School
University of Melbourne alumni
Women sportswriters
Australian women television presenters
Television personalities from Melbourne
Radio personalities from Melbourne